Pilosocereus albisummus is a species of Pilosocereus found in Minas Gerais, Brazil.

References

External links

albisummus